Jens Jacobs (born 19 November 2003) is a Dutch professional footballer who plays as a right-back for Eerste Divisie club VVV-Venlo.

Career
Jacobs was born in Maasbree, Limburg, and played football for local club MVC '19 for six years before joining the VVV-Venlo youth academy in December 2014, through which he then progressed.

In the pre-season ahead of the 2022–23 Eerste Divisie, new head coach Rick Kruys called up Jacobs to VVV's first team squad. He made his professional debut in the opening league game of the season on 5 August 2022, a 3–0 win over Almere City, where he replaced Richard Sedláček in the 85th minute. His following appearance, a league game against PEC Zwolle on 21 August, did not go well for him after having early on replaced an injured Sem Dirks. Shortly after, Jacobs scored an own goal to open the score and was later sent off for a second bookable offence before half-time, as VVV went on to lose 4–0. In October 2022, Jacobs was officially promoted to the VVV first team alongside fellow youth player Luuk Vosselman.

Personal life
Jacobs is also a highly successful esports player. In January 2021, he was prolific in the Weekend League of the video game FIFA 21, winning all 30 games he played on PlayStation. This ranked him 37th place worldwide.

Career statistics

References

External links
 

2003 births
Living people
People from Peel en Maas
Dutch footballers
Dutch esports players
Association football fullbacks
VVV-Venlo players
Eerste Divisie players
Footballers from Limburg (Netherlands)